Kitchen Point is a rocky point at the east end of Tirizis Island off the east coast of Robert Island in the South Shetland Islands, Antarctica. It is projecting into Bransfield Strait to form the southeast side of the entrance to Kozloduy Cove and the north side of the entrance to Kruni Cove.

The feature is named after the Captain Joseph Kitchen, Master of the British sealing ship Ann that visited the South Shetland Islands in 1821–22.

Location

See also
 Robert Island
 South Shetland Islands

Maps
 L.L. Ivanov. Antarctica: Livingston Island and Greenwich, Robert, Snow and Smith Islands. Scale 1:120000 topographic map.  Troyan: Manfred Wörner Foundation, 2009.

References
 Kitchen Point. SCAR Composite Antarctic Gazetteer

Headlands of Robert Island